Kim Yong-ok may refer to:

 Kim Yong-ok (weightlifter) (born 1976), North Korean Olympic weightlifter
 Do-ol (born 1948), pen name of the contemporary South Korean philosopher Yong-Ok Kim